Ketil Are Haugsand (born 13 June 1947, Oslo, Norway) is a Norwegian harpsichordist and conductor.

Biography
Haugsand started his musical studies in Trondheim and Oslo, and later studied in Prague and Haarlem. In 1973, he earned his solo diploma. In 1975, he was awarded the Prix d'Excellence at the Amsterdam conservatory, where he studied under Gustav Leonhardt.

Haugsand is now a world-renowned harpsichordist and has toured extensively in Europe, Israel and the United States. Major recordings include Johann Sebastian Bach's Goldberg Variations and several recordings with the Norwegian Baroque Orchestra. He was professor of music at the Norwegian Academy of Music in 1974–95. Since 1995, he has been a professor at the Hochschule für Musik (Academy of Music) in Cologne, Germany.

Discography 

As soloist
1981: Louis Marchand: Pièces De Clavecin (Simax Classics)
1995: Carlos Seixas: Harpsichord Concerto • Sinfonia • Harpsichord Sonatas (Virgin Veritas)
2002: J.S. Bach: Goldberg Variations (Simax Classics)
1994: Johann Sebastian Bach: The Six Partitas, BWV 825-830 (Simax Classics)
1994: Carlos Seixas: Missa • Dixit Dominus • Tantum Ergo • Organ Sonatas (Virgin Veritas), with the Norwegian Baroque Orchestra, chorus Coro de Câmara de Lisboa
	
Chamber music
1993: Jean-Philippe Rameau: Pièces De Clavecin En Concerts (Simax Classics), with Catherine Mackintosh and Laurence Dreyfus
1993: Marin Marais: Les Folies D'Espagne & Tombeau For Lully And For Ste. Colombe And Other Works From Pièces De Violes (1701) (Simax Classics), with Laurence Dreyfus
2002: The Chamber Works Of Johan Henrik Freithoff (Simax Classics)
2011: Jean Baptiste Loeillet De Gant: Recorder Sonatas (Naxos Music), with Daniel Rothert, Vanessa Young

References

External links 
Ketil Haugsand at Bach Cantatas Website

Norwegian conductors (music)
Male conductors (music)
Norwegian harpsichordists
Simax Classics artists
Virgin Veritas artists
Naxos Records artists
1947 births
Living people
21st-century conductors (music)
21st-century Norwegian male musicians